Adriano Montalto (born 6 April 1988) is an Italian footballer who plays for  club Reggiana on loan from Reggina.

Biography
Born in Erice, Sicily Island, Montalto started his career at Sicilian club Messina. in summer 2007 he was signed by Serie C2 club Scafatese in temporary deal. Montalto became a free agent after Messina's bankruptcy in July 2008. Montalto became a player of the third-tier club Lecco in 2008–09 Lega Pro Prima Divisione. Montalto did not play any game in the first half of 2009–10 season. He was signed by Serie B club Salernitana in January 2010 in a -year contract. He wore no.11 shirt for the first team. However, he did not play any game in 2009–10 Serie B. The club relegated to the third tier in 2010, which Montalto had played 12 times. In 2011 Salernitana bankrupted. Montalto joined another third-tier club Siracusa in summer 2011. Montalto made 10 starts for the club until January 2012, which he was signed by Serie B club Ascoli on 31 January 2012.

On 24 August 2012 Montalto returned to the third tier for Latina. The club won promotion to Serie B at the end of season while Ascoli relegated from Serie B. Ascoli also re-signed Montalto on 22 January 2013 in temporary deal, with Andrea Giallombardo moved to Latina from Ascoli Piceno also in temporary deal.

On 2 September 2013 Montalto was signed by the third-tier club Grosseto, with Marco Crimi moved to opposite direction in temporary deal. On 10 January 2014 Montalto left for Lega Pro Seconda Divisione (4th tier) club Martina, which the club had to finish 8th or above in order to avoid relegation to Serie D, as the second division of Lega Pro would merge with the prime division of Lega Pro at the end of 2013–14 season, making the first three tier of Italian football were professional leagues only.

In 2015, he was signed by Trapani in a 1-year deal (with optional further years).

On 25 August 2016 he was signed by Juve Stabia.

On 28 August 2019, he joined Venezia on a season-long loan.

On 5 October 2020 he signed a two-year contract with Bari.

On 26 January 2021 he moved to Serie B club Reggina on a 1.5-year contract. On 1 September 2022, Montalto joined Reggiana on loan, with Reggiana holding an obligation to buy his rights in case of promotion to Serie B.

References

External links
 AIC profile (data by www.football.it) 
 

Italian footballers
A.C.R. Messina players
S.S. Scafatese Calcio 1922 players
Calcio Lecco 1912 players
U.S. Salernitana 1919 players
U.S. Siracusa players
Ascoli Calcio 1898 F.C. players
Latina Calcio 1932 players
F.C. Grosseto S.S.D. players
A.S.D. Martina Calcio 1947 players
Trapani Calcio players
Ternana Calcio players
U.S. Cremonese players
Venezia F.C. players
S.S.C. Bari players
Reggina 1914 players
A.C. Reggiana 1919 players
Serie B players
Serie C players
Association football forwards
People from Erice
Footballers from Sicily
1988 births
Living people
Sportspeople from the Province of Trapani